"Get the Music On" is a pop–dance song by Australian singer Sophie Monk, and was the second single from her debut album Calendar Girl (2003). It was co-written and produced by Ray "Madman" Hedges (who previously worked with Monk on the Bardot single "I Need Somebody").

The single was released on 31 March 2003 and debuted at number 11 on the ARIA Charts in April 2003 and peaked a week later at number 10. Monk co-wrote the B-side "Shake".

Music video 
The video features Monk with a long red dress, red lips and a tight sleek ponytail walking through a nightclub. While Monk is seen in color, the background and the other people are in black and white.

Track listing 
 "Get the Music On" – 3:45
 "Shake" – 3:25
 "Get the Music On" (Chilli Hifly Radio Remix) – 4:14
 "Get the Music On" (Stadium Remix) – 4:16
 "Get the Music On" (Chilli Hifly Extended Remix) – 6:37

Charts

References 

2003 songs
Songs written by Ray Hedges
Song recordings produced by Ray Hedges
Songs written by Nigel Butler